The 1996 NCAA Division I softball tournament was the fifteenth annual tournament to determine the national champion of NCAA women's collegiate softball. Held during May 1996, thirty-two Division I college softball teams contested the championship. The tournament featured eight regionals of four teams, each in a double elimination format. The 1996 Women's College World Series was held in Columbus, Georgia from May 23 through May 27 and marked the conclusion of the 1996 NCAA Division I softball season.  This marked the last time that the Women's College World Series was held in a city other than Oklahoma City, Oklahoma, and previewed Golden Park's hosting of softball events for the 1996 Summer Olympics.  Arizona won their fourth NCAA championship by defeating  6–4 in the final game.  Arizona second baseman Jenny Dalton was named Women's College World Series Most Outstanding Player.

Qualifying

Regionals

Regional No. 1

Arizona qualifies for WCWS.

Regional No. 2

Michigan qualifies for WCWS.

Regional No. 3

Iowa qualifies for WCWS.

Regional No. 4

Southwestern Louisiana qualifies for WCWS.

Regional No. 5

California qualifies for WCWS.

Regional No. 6

Princeton qualifies for WCWS.

Regional No. 7

UCLA qualifies for WCWS.

Regional No. 8

Washington qualifies for WCWS.

Women's College World Series

Participants

Arizona

Bracket

Championship Game

All-Tournament Team
The following players were named to the All-Tournament Team

References

1996 NCAA Division I softball season
NCAA Division I softball tournament